The 1991–92 season was Heart of Midlothian F.C.s 9th consecutive season of play in the Scottish Premier Division. Hearts also competed in the Scottish Cup & the Scottish League Cup.

Fixtures

Friendlies

League Cup

Scottish Cup

Scottish Premier Division

Scottish Premier Division table

Stats

Squad information

|}

Scorers

See also
List of Heart of Midlothian F.C. seasons

References

1991-92

External links
Official Club website

Heart of Midlothian F.C. seasons
Heart of Midlothian